Charles Peter Martin Vestergaard (10 April 1884 – 3 May 1956) was a Danish racewalker. He competed in the men's 3500 metres walk at the 1908 Summer Olympics.

References

1884 births
1956 deaths
Athletes (track and field) at the 1908 Summer Olympics
Danish male racewalkers
Olympic athletes of Denmark
Place of birth missing